Pällu is a village in Saue Parish, Harju County in northern Estonia.

References
 

Villages in Harju County